Uraarachne is a genus of spiders in the family Thomisidae. It was first described in 1880 by Keyserling. , it contains 11 South American species.

Species
 it contains 11 species:
 Uraarachne brevipes (Simon, 1886) — Uruguay
 Uraarachne ceratophrys (Grismado & Achitte-Schmutzler, 2020) — Argentina
 Uraarachne cornuta (Simon, 1886) — Paraguay, Uruguay, Argentina
 Uraarachne kapiity (Grismado & Achitte-Schmutzler, 2020) — Paraguay, Argentina
 Uraarachne longa (Keyserling, 1880) — Brazil, Paraguay
 Uraarachne panthera (Grismado & Achitte-Schmutzler, 2020) — Argentina
 Uraarachne plana (Simon, 1895) — Paraguay, Argentina
 Uraarachne runcinioides (Simon, 1886) — Uruguay, Argentina
 Uraarachne toro (Grismado & Achitte-Schmutzler, 2020) — Argentina
 Uraarachne variegata (Mello-Leitão, 1941) — Paraguay, Argentina
 Uraarachne vittata (Caporiacco, 1954) — French Guiana

References

Thomisidae
Araneomorphae genera
Spiders of South America
Taxa named by Eugen von Keyserling